Iping is a village and parish in the Chichester district of West Sussex, England. The village lies on the River Rother.

Etymology
The Old English name means settlement of the family or followers of a man called Ipa.

History

Iron age
There is an Iron Age contour fort on the hill at Hammer Wood north of the village.

Iping Roman station
This rectangular earthwork with rounded corners lies astride the Roman road between two major British tribal centres at Noviomagus Regnorum (Chichester) and Calleva Atrebatum (Silchester), which runs north–south through Iping. It is similar in size to the way stations at Hardham and Alfoldean on Stane Street. The station is situated at National Grid Reference SU:844261 (51° 1'40.46"N - 0°47'51.16"W), just over two miles to the north of Iping village and little over half a mile from the crossroads in the centre of the village of Milland, just south-east of the point where the Roman road crossed the Hammer Stream. Although unexcavated, surface finds of Roman material have been found within the confines of the earthwork. It could easily be confused with the Hammer Wood Iron Age contour fort which lies much closer to modern Iping.

Domesday Book
Iping was listed in the Domesday Book (1086) in the ancient hundred of Easebourne as having 15 households: eight villagers, two smallholders and five slaves; with woodland, ploughing land, meadows, a church and a mill, it had a value to the lord of the manor of £4.

Modern era

Iping is the setting for the classic H. G. Wells science fiction story (1897) The Invisible Man.

Iping Water Mill was producing paper until the 1920s when a fire ended 900 years of various types of milling.

Parish church
St Mary's Church, Iping, is a solid sandstone Victorian church which was rebuilt in 1885. The church was built on the site of an old Saxon church and it is thought an even earlier church was on the site before this.

Commons
Iping Common sits south of the A272 and is managed by the Sussex Wildlife Trust. This heathland is a Site of Special Scientific Interest and is part of the larger Iping and Stedham Commons.

References

External links

Further historical information and sources on GENUKI

Villages in West Sussex